Dzięcioły Bliższe  is a village in the administrative district of Gmina Sterdyń, win Sokołów County, Masovian Voivodeship, in  eastern Poland.

References

Villages in Sokołów County